Pollicipes is a genus of goose barnacles, first described by William Elford Leach in 1817. It comprises four species of marine suspension-feeders.

Species
These species belong to the genus Pollicipes:
 Pollicipes caboverdensis Fernandes, Cruz & Van Syoc, 2010
 Pollicipes elegans (Lesson, 1831) (Pacific goose barnacle)
 Pollicipes pollicipes (Gmelin, 1791 [in Gmelin, 1788-1792]) (goose barnacle)
 Pollicipes polymerus Sowerby, 1833 (gooseneck barnacle)

References

External links

Pollicipes polymerus

Barnacles